Syed Ghulam Hussain Shah Bukhari (1932 – 26 January 2023) was a Pakistani Islamic scholar. He belonged to the Naqshbandi Sufi school of thought. He managed the Dargah Hussainabad, one of the largest religious institutions in Pakistan.

Biography
Syed Ghulam Hussain Shah Bukhari was born in 1932 in the village of Drib Chandia, Qambar Shahdadkot, Bombay Presidency, British India.

In 1980, he built a masjid and madrassa titled Dargah Hussainabad where religious education and accommodation is free of all political associations. He was also the head of Tanzeem Islahul Fuqra Al-Hussainia, that also provides religious education to people.

In 2013 Bukhari was attacked by terrorists.

Bukhari died at Karachi's private hospital on 26 January 2023, at the age of 90.

See also 
 Pir Fazal Ali Qureshi
 Khwaja Abdul Ghaffar Naqshbandi

References

External links
 Pir of Qambar Sharif injured in bomb attack, grandson killed
 Speeches By Syed Ghulam Hussain Shah Bukhari

1932 births
2023 deaths
Indian emigrants to Pakistan
Naturalised citizens of Pakistan
Indian Sunni Muslims
Pakistani Sunni Muslims
Naqshbandi order
Sufi mystics
Sufism in Sindh
Sufis of Sindh
Sindhi people